The Bailiwick of Guernsey is a British crown dependency off the coast of France.

Holders of the post of Governor of Guernsey, until the role was abolished in 1835. Since then, only Lieutenant-Governors have been appointed (see Lieutenant Governor of Guernsey).

A roll of honour of the Governors and Lieutenant Governors of Guernsey from 1198 to date has been installed at Government House.

12th century 

 Julian de la Plaque, (Prince Pracle) (1111)
 Walter Duncker, (1154)
 Peter Cornet, (1167)
 John, Count of Mortain (1198)
 Sir William Orseth, (1199)

13th century 

 George Ballizon, (Gregory Balizon) (1203)
 Peter de Preaux (1206)
 Geoffrey de Lucy, (1225-6) 
 Richard Grey, (1226)
 William de St John, (1227)
 Arnauldus de St Amand and Philip de Carteret, (1232)
 Philip de Albimar and William St John,
 Prince Edward, in appanage, (1271)
 Steven Wallard, (Stephen Waller) (1284) 
 Otton de Grandson, (1290)
 Henry de Cobham, (1299)

14th century 

 Sir Peter Cornet, (who began to build Castle Cornet) (1312)
 Sir William Oethfinde,
 Edmund Rose,
 Otton de Grandson,(1323)
 John de Roches, (1330)
 William de Montagou and Henry de Ferrure, (1335)
 Thomas de Ferrariis, (1339)
 Thomas Hampton, (1342)
 John Mantaners, (1350)
 Thomas Holland (1356)
 Sir Edmund de Chene, (1360)
 Walter Huet, (1372) 
 Edmund Rose and Hugh Calvilegh, (1374)
 John Golafre, (1388)
 Edmund Earl of Rutland, (1397)

15th century 
 Edward Duke of York, in appanage (1415)
 John Duke of Bedford (1430)
 Humphrey, Duke of Gloucester (1435)
 Henry Beauchamp, 1st Duke of Warwick (1446)
 William Bertram and Nicholas Hault, (1447)
 John Nanfan, (1453)
 Geffrey Wallifly, (1470)
 Sir John Tichefilde,(1482)
 Duarte Brandão (1482–1485) 
 Edward Weston (1486–1509)
 John Avril, (1488)
 Sir William Weston,

16th century
 Sir Richard Weston, (1509–1541)
 Sir Francis Weston (1533–1536) (co-governor with his father, Richard Weston)
 Sir Richard Weston, reverted to sole governor until his death, (1536–1541)
 Sir Richard Long, (1541–1545)
 Sir Peter Mewtis, (1545–1553)
 Sir Leonard Chamberlain, (1553–1561)
 Sir Francis Chamberlain, (1561–1570)
 Sir Thomas Leighton, (1570–1609)

17th century
 George Carew, 1st Earl of Totnes, (1610–1621)
 Henry Danvers, 1st Earl of Danby, (1621–1644)
 Robert Rich, 2nd Earl of Warwick, (1643–1644)
 Sir Peter Osborne, (1644–1649)
 Henry Percy, Baron Percy of Alnwick (1649–1650)
 Colonel Alban Coxe, (1649–1650)
 Colonel John Bingham, (1651–1660)
 Major Henry Wanseye (1660)
 Sir Hugh Pollard, (1660–1662)
 Christopher Hatton, 1st Baron Hatton of Kirby, (1662–1665)
 Colonel Sir Jonathan Atkins, (1665–1670)
 Christopher Hatton, 1st Viscount Hatton of Grendon, (1670–1706)
 Colonel Mordaunt, (1697)

18th century
 General Charles Churchill (1706–1714)
 Giles Spencer, (1711) 
 Lieutenant-General Daniel Harvey (1715–1732)
 Lewis Dollon, (1726)
 The Rt Hon George Cholmondeley, 2nd Earl of Cholmondeley (1732–1733)
 Major-General Richard Sutton (1733–1737)
 Field Marshal François de La Rochefoucauld, marquis de Montandre (1737–1739)
 Thomas Fermor, 1st Earl of Pomfret (1739–1742)
 Algernon Seymour, 7th Duke of Somerset (1742–1750)
 Field Marshal Sir John Ligonier (1750–1752)
 General John West, 1st Earl De La Warr (1752–1766)
 Sir Richard Lyttelton (1766–1770)
 Field Marshal Sir Jeffery Amherst, 1st Baron Amherst (1770–1797)
 General Charles Grey, 1st Earl Grey (1797–1807)

19th century
 Lieutenant-General George Herbert, 11th Earl of Pembroke (1807–1827)
 Sir William Keppel (1827–1834)
 position of Governor abolished in 1835

See also
 List of Bailiffs of Guernsey
 List of Lieutenant Governors of Guernsey
 List of Bailiffs of Jersey
 List of Lieutenant Governors of Jersey

References

Guernsey, Governors
Guernsey
Governors
Governors
Governors
Guernsey